Frederick Biggin (16 February 1869 – 30 September 1968), was an English international lawn bowls player who competed in the 1934 British Empire Games.

Bowls career
At the 1934 British Empire Games he won the gold medal in the rinks/fours event with Robert Slater, Ernie Gudgeon and Percy Tomlinson.

He was the Surrey singles champion and was a member of the Temple Bowls Club.

Personal life
He worked in Insurance by trade and lived at 108 Cheviot Road, West Norwood.

References

English male bowls players
Bowls players at the 1934 British Empire Games
Commonwealth Games gold medallists for England
Commonwealth Games medallists in lawn bowls
1869 births
1968 deaths
Medallists at the 1934 British Empire Games